Chay Avafi (also Romanized as Chāy ʿAvafī) is a village in Moshrageh Rural District, Moshrageh District, Ramshir County, Khuzestan Province, Iran. At the 2006 census, its population was 71, in 18 families.

References 

Populated places in Ramshir County